Shelly Hoerner is an American former softball player and current coach at Appalachian State.

Career
Hoerner attended Barry University for two years, before transferring to Canisius College, where she played for the Canisius Golden Griffins softball team. Hoerner later went on to serve as head softball coach at Valdosta State University in 2000, at Barry University from 2001 to 2005, at the College of Charleston from 2006 to 2013, and at Georgia Tech from 2014 to 2017. Hoerner was named head softball coach at Appalachian State University on June 22, 2017.

Head coaching record

References

External links
 
 Appalachian State bio
 College of Charleston bio

Year of birth missing (living people)
Living people
Female sports coaches
American softball coaches
Appalachian State Mountaineers softball coaches
Barry Buccaneers softball coaches
Canisius Golden Griffins softball players
Georgia Tech Yellow Jackets softball coaches
Barry Buccaneers softball players
Valdosta State Blazers softball coaches
College of Charleston Cougars softball coaches